Two Cops is a 1993 South Korean action/comedy film directed by Kang Woo-suk. It stars Ahn Sung-ki and Park Joong-hoon as a pair of police detectives with different outlooks who end up working on a case together.

Plot
The experienced detective Jo has a new partner, Kang who recently graduated from the Police Academy at the top of the class. The idealistic Kang always sticks to his principles and often conflicts with Jo, an amoral cop who always tries to take advantage of his position. Kang tries to win Jo over to his side, but fails. One day, a beautiful woman who works in a bar comes to the police station for help, and Kang falls in love with her. He starts going to the bar often to see her, and begins to become more like Jo. Jo is initially pleased at this, but later begins to experience a dilemma with Kang's change in attitude.

Cast
Ahn Sung-ki as Jo, senior detective
Park Joong-hoon as Kang, new recruit
Ji Soo-won as Soo-won
Kim Bo-sung as Lee, detective
Kim Hye-ok as detective Jo's wife
Shim Yang-hong as police chief
Yang Taek-jo as unit head

Reception
Despite criticism that its plot was copied from the 1984 French film My New Partner, Two Cops became a box office hit upon its release on December 18, 1993. A highly commercial crowd pleaser that also dealt with the serious theme of police corruption, it was the second most-watched Korean film of 1993, after Sopyonje.

The financial success of Two Cops enabled Kang Woo-suk to set up his own film production and distribution company, Cinema Service.

The film spawned two sequels came : Two Cops 2 (1996), and Two Cops 3 (1998).

Awards
1994 30th Baeksang Arts Awards
Grand Prize (Daesang) in Film: Ahn Sung-ki
Best Film: Two Cops
Best Director: Kang Woo-suk
Best Actor: Ahn Sung-ki 
Best New Actress: Ji Soo-won

1994 32nd Grand Bell Awards
Best Actor: Ahn Sung-ki and Park Joong-hoon (tie)
Most Popular Actor: Ahn Sung-ki, Park Joong-hoon

1994 14th Korean Association of Film Critics Awards
Best Actor: Ahn Sung-ki

1994 15th Blue Dragon Film Awards
Most Popular Film (awarded to the movie with the highest viewership throughout the previous year)

References

External links

1993 films
1990s Korean-language films
South Korean action comedy films
Films directed by Kang Woo-suk
1993 action comedy films
South Korean buddy films
1990s buddy cop films